The 1986 Barking and Dagenham Borough Council election took place on 8 May 1986 to elect members of Barking and Dagenham London Borough Council in London, England. The whole council was up for election and the Labour Party stayed in overall control of the council.

Background
108 candidates nominated in total. Labour again ran a full slate and was the only party to do so. By contrast the Conservative Party ran only 21 candidates whilst the combined SDP-Liberal Alliance and the Liberal Democratic Focus Team ran 24.

Election result
Labour continued to win a large majority of seats - 35 out of 48. The Conservatives and the Residents Association each held their 3 seats. The SDP–Liberal Alliance/Liberal Focus Team won 5 seats and 2 Independents were also elected.

Ward results

Abbey

Alibon

Cambell

Chadwell Heath

Eastbrook

Eastbury

Fanshawe

Gascoigne

Goresbrook

Heath

Longbridge

Manor

Marks Gate

Parsloes

River

Thames

Triptons

Valence

Village

By-elections between 1986 and 1990

Gascoigne

The by-election was called following the death of Cllr. Alan R. Beadle.

Fanshawe

The by-election was called following the death of Cllr. Ernest A. Turner.

Marks Gate

The by-election was called following the resignation of Cllr. Donald I. Pepper.

River

The by-election was called following the resignation of Cllr. Patricia A. Twomey.

Abbey

The by-election was called following the resignation of Cllr. Abdul M. Khokhar.

References

1986
1986 London Borough council elections